Meryem Altun (1976 – April 1, 2002) was a Turkish prisoner who died on hunger strike. She attended Umraniye high school, was a critic of the Turkish prison system, She was declared a martyr by the Revolutionary People's Liberation Front. Altun was in Umraniye prison at the time of a December 19, 2000 massacre of prisoners by prison guards.

References

External links
Article on Meryem Altun
Statement on her death from the DHKC

1976 births
2002 deaths
People who died on hunger strike
Turkish people who died in prison custody
Turkish emigrants to the United Kingdom
Prisoners and detainees of Turkey
Turkish prisoners and detainees
Turkish human rights activists